Miroslava Najdanovski (Serbian Cyrillic: Мирослава Најдановски, born 10 January 1988 in Zrenjanin, SR Serbia, SFR Yugoslavia) is a 3-time Serbian Olympic swimmer.

Najdanovski represented Serbia and Montenegro at the 2004 Summer Olympics. At only 16 years of age, she was the youngest member of the Serbo-Montenegrin delegation and also one of the youngest athletes to compete at the 2004 Summer Olympics in Athens, Greece. She participated in one event, the Women's 50 metre freestyle, in which she took 43rd place overall among 75 competitors with a time of 27.18.

She represented Serbia at the 2008 Summer Olympics in Beijing, China. Najdanovski qualified at the 2007 World Aquatics Championships in Melbourne, Australia. She took 36th place in the Women's 100 m freestyle with a time of 57.11. Later the same year, she competed at a national cup in Belgrade and qualified for the Women's 50 m freestyle as well, thanks to a time of 26.03. She therefore competed in both events.

She competed in the women's 50m freestyle at the 2012 Summer Olympics in London, finishing with a time of 26.46 seconds, achieving 42nd place in the heats.

See also
 List of swimmers
 List of Serbian records in swimming

References

 Profile at Olympic Committee of Serbia

External links
 
 
 
 

1988 births
Living people
Serbian female swimmers
Serbian female freestyle swimmers
Swimmers at the 2004 Summer Olympics
Swimmers at the 2008 Summer Olympics
Swimmers at the 2012 Summer Olympics
Sportspeople from Zrenjanin
Olympic swimmers of Serbia and Montenegro
Olympic swimmers of Serbia
Mediterranean Games gold medalists for Serbia
Swimmers at the 2009 Mediterranean Games
Universiade medalists in swimming
Mediterranean Games medalists in swimming
Universiade bronze medalists for Serbia
Medalists at the 2009 Summer Universiade